The Bridge near West Liberty is an historic structure located west of the town of West Liberty in rural Muscatine County, Iowa, United States.  The welded steel rigid frame bridge was built in 1937.  It was designed by Otto Wendling of the Iowa State Highway Commission.  The bridge was listed on the National Register of Historic Places in 1998 as a part of the Highway Bridges of Iowa MPS.  The bridge was demolished and replaced by a culvert in 2020

References

Bridges completed in 1937
Bridges in Muscatine County, Iowa
National Register of Historic Places in Muscatine County, Iowa
Road bridges on the National Register of Historic Places in Iowa
Steel bridges in the United States